Die geheimnisvolle Villa (lit. 'The Secret-Filled Villa') is a 1914 silent German detective film directed by Joe May and starring Ernst Reicher. It is the first in the series starring the fictional gentleman detective Stuart Webbs, modelled on Sherlock Holmes. It also features Werner Krauss.

It was made at Continental-Kunstfilm's studios at 123 Chausseestraße, Berlin, and premièred at the Union-Theater Kammerlichtspiele cinema (later the Tauentzien Palast).

Cast
 Ernst Reicher as Stuart Webbs
 Sabine Impekoven
 Julius Falkenstein
 Carl Auen
 Werner Krauss
 Max Landa
 Eva May
 Mia May
 Lupu Pick
 Fritz Richard

References

External links

1914 films
German black-and-white films
Films of the German Empire
Films directed by Joe May
German silent feature films
1910s German-language films
1910s German films
Silent crime films